Dole is a village at the entity line of Federation of B&H-Republika Srpska. In 1991, it was part of the municipality of Kladanj, Bosnia and Herzegovina. Today, it is mainly part of Šekovići, Republika Srpska. It is inhabited by ethnic Serbs.

Demographics 
According to the 2013 census, its population was 64, all Serbs living in the Šekovići part thus none in the Kladanj part.

References

Populated places in Kladanj
Populated places in Šekovići